Echo is a various artists compilation album released in 1996 by Full Contact Records.

Reception
Aiding & Abetting gave Echo a positive review and said "the range of possibilities in electronic music is pretty wide, and this set shows that quite well." Lollipop Magazine said "Intent on being an overview of Fifth Colvmn’s sister label Full Contact, Echo does its best to showcase the best music they’ve got" and "if you ever wanted a reasonably full understanding of what the "alternative" label means to Electro bands, Echo comes pretty damn close." Sonic Boom said "There isn't a single letdown track on the whole record with stellar performances turned in by Ipecac Loop, C17H19NO3, Shinjuku Filth & Zia" and "almost all of the tracks on this compilation are exclusive and appear nowhere else which makes this a must have for serious completists."

Track listing

Personnel
Adapted from the Echo liner notes.

 John Bergin – producer, cover art, illustrations, design, art direction

Release history

References

External links 
 

1996 compilation albums
Full Contact Records compilation albums
Fifth Colvmn Records compilation albums